A footprint or land pattern is the arrangement of pads (in surface-mount technology) or through-holes (in through-hole technology) used to physically attach and electrically connect a component to a printed circuit board. The land pattern on a circuit board matches the arrangement of leads on a component.

Component manufacturers often produce multiple pin-compatible product variants to allow systems integrators to change the exact component in use without changing the footprint on the circuit board. This can provide large cost savings for integrators, especially with dense BGA components where the footprint pads may be connected to multiple layers of the circuit board.

Many component vendors provide footprints for their components, including Texas Instruments, and CUI. Other sources include third party libraries, such as SnapEDA.

See also 
 Surface-mount technology
 Through-hole technology
 Chip carrier
 List of integrated circuit packaging types
 IPC (standards body)
 JEDEC (standards body)

References 

Electronic engineering
Electronics manufacturing